Oregon Route 99E is an Oregon state highway that runs between Junction City, Oregon and an interchange with I-5 just south of the Oregon/Washington border, in Portland.  It, along with OR 99W, makes up a split of OR 99 in the northern part of the state.  This split existed when the route was U.S. Route 99, when the two branches were U.S. 99W and U.S. 99E.  (Another such split occurred in California, but with the decommissioning of U.S. 99, that state elected to rename its U.S. 99W as Interstate 5, rather than preserve the directional suffix.)

Currently, OR 99E and OR 99W do not reconvene at a northern junction in Oregon; OR 99W has been truncated from its original route, and ends in Downtown Portland, several miles south of its original northern terminus; nor is OR 99 (without a suffix) signed anywhere in Portland.

History

Route description

OR 99E has its southern terminus in Junction City.  Almost immediately after leaving the city limits the route crosses the Willamette River, and serves Willamette Valley towns such as Harrisburg and Tangent.  North of Tangent, the route enters the city of Albany and serves as a main thoroughfare through town (for about a mile, OR 99E shares an alignment with US 20).  At the northern end of Albany, OR 99E joins I-5.

OR 99E remains co-signed with I-5 until Salem where it again splits off from the interstate, serving many towns in northern Marion County.  (A business route through Salem, OR 99E Business, consists of a section of OR 22 and the Salem Parkway; a previous alignment of OR 99E along Commercial Street, Fairgrounds Road, and Portland Road is often erroneously referred to as "99E" even though it is no longer part of the Oregon Route system).  North of Salem, OR 99E serves the northern Willamette Valley, passing through cities such as Woodburn, Hubbard, and Canby, before entering the Portland metro area in Oregon City.  The stretch between Canby and Oregon City is notorious for frequent and serious accidents.

Starting in Oregon City, and continuing through the suburban communities of Gladstone, Oak Grove and Milwaukie, OR 99E is known as McLoughlin Boulevard (after fur trader John McLoughlin).  The road crosses the John McLoughlin Bridge just south of Gladstone. North of Milwaukie (and an interchange with OR 224), OR 99E is a high-capacity urban expressway.

In Portland, OR 99E continues as the McLoughlin Boulevard expressway until passing beneath the Ross Island Bridge (US 26), where it runs on the couplet of Martin Luther King Jr. Boulevard (formerly Union Avenue) and Grand Avenue.  It is the main north–south arterial through the central east side of the city.  North of NE Broadway, OR 99E continues as MLK Jr. Boulevard and passes through several Northeast Portland Neighborhoods until its terminus at an interchange with I-5 and OR 120 in Delta Park, just south of the Columbia River crossing.  (The interchange also involves Interstate Avenue, which was the prior route of OR 99W before the latter route was truncated).

Major intersections
Note: mileposts do not reflect actual mileage due to realignments. Not all interchanges are shown on the I-5 overlap; for a full list see the I-5 exit list.

Related routes
U.S. Route 99
Oregon Route 99
Oregon Route 99E Business
Oregon Route 99W

References

099E
U.S. Route 99
Transportation in Marion County, Oregon
Transportation in Clackamas County, Oregon
Transportation in Lane County, Oregon
Transportation in Multnomah County, Oregon
Transportation in Linn County, Oregon
Gladstone, Oregon